Christian Marclay (born January 11, 1955) is a visual artist and composer. He holds both American and Swiss nationality.

Marclay's work explores connections between sound, noise, photography, video, and film. A pioneer of using gramophone records and turntables as musical instruments to create sound collages, Marclay is, in the words of critic Thom Jurek, perhaps the "unwitting inventor of turntablism." His own use of turntables and records, beginning in the late 1970s, was developed independently of but roughly parallel to hip hop's use of the instrument.

Early life and education
Christian Marclay was born on January 11, 1955, in San Rafael, Marin County, California, to a Swiss father and an American mother and raised in Geneva, Switzerland. He studied at the Ecole Supérieure d'Art Visuel in Geneva (1975–1977), the Massachusetts College of Art in Boston (1977–1980, Bachelor of Fine Arts) in the Studio for Interrelated Media Program, and the Cooper Union in New York (1978). As a student he was notably interested in Joseph Beuys and the Fluxus movement of the 1960s and 1970s. Long based in Manhattan, Marclay has in recent years divided his time between New York and London.

Work
Citing the influence of John Cage, Yoko Ono and Vito Acconci, Marclay has long explored the rituals around making and collecting music. Drawn to the energy of punk rock, he began creating songs, singing to music on pre-recorded backing tapes. Unable to recruit a drummer for his 1979 performances with guitarist Kurt Henry, Marclay used the regular rhythms of a skipping LP record as a percussion instrument. These duos with Henry might be the first time a musician used records and turntables as interactive, improvising musical instruments.

Marclay sometimes manipulates or damages records to produce continuous loops and skips, and has said he generally prefers inexpensive used records purchased at thrift shops, as opposed to other turntablists who often seek out specific recordings. In 1998 he claimed never to have paid more than US$1 for a record. Marclay has occasionally cut and re-joined different LP records; when played on a turntable, these re-assembled records will combine snippets of different music in quick succession along with clicks or pops from the seams – typical of noise music – and when the original LPs were made of differently-colored vinyl, the reassembled LPs can themselves be considered as works of art.

Some of Marclay's musical pieces are carefully recorded and edited plunderphonics-style; he is also active in free improvisation. He was filmed performing a duo with Erikm for the documentary Scratch. His scene didn't make the final cut, but is included among the DVD extras.

Marclay released Record Without a Cover on Recycled Records in 1985, "...designed to be sold without a jacket, not even a sleeve!" Accumulating dust and fingerprints would enhance the sound. A review in Spin at the time cited Marclay's "coolest theatrical gesture" in his live performances of phonoguitar: the artist strapped a record player onto himself and played, for example, a Jimi Hendrix album. In Five Cubes (1989), he melted vinyl records into cubes. In the 1980s and early '90s, he invented album covers. The Sound of Silence (1988) is a black-and-white photograph of the Simon & Garfunkel single of the same title.

Following this turn, Marclay has in more recent years produced visual art, although usually of representations of sound, or the various technologies of representing sound. His Graffiti Composition (2002) posted musical notes on walls around Berlin, compiled photographs of them as they faded, and is performed in concert. Shuffle (2007) and Ephemera (2009) are also musical scores. In Sound Holes (2007), he photographed the many patterns of speaker holes on intercoms. From 2007-2009 he worked with cyanotype at Graphicstudio to capture the motion of cassette tapes unspooling. And an interest in onomatopoeia dating back to 1989 has culminated in his monumental Manga Scroll (2010), a 60-foot scroll of cartoon interjections that doubles as a musical score.

In 2010 he produced The Clock, a 24-hour compilation of time-related scenes from movies that debuted at London's White Cube gallery in 2010. In 2016 he produced Made to Be Destroyed, a compilation of film clips showing the destruction of art works or buildings.

Thom Jurek writes that "While many intellectuals have made wild pronouncements about Marclay and his art – and it is art, make no mistake – writing all sorts of blather about how he strips the adult century bare by his cutting up of vinyl records and pasting them together with parts from other vinyl records, they never seem to mention that these sound collages of his are charming, very human, and quite often intentionally hilarious."

Marclay has performed and recorded both solo and in collaboration with many musicians, including John Zorn, William Hooker, Elliott Sharp, Otomo Yoshihide, Butch Morris, Shelley Hirsch, Flo Kaufmann and Crevice; he has also performed with the group Sonic Youth, and in other projects with Sonic Youth's members.

Other activities
 Swiss Institute Contemporary Art New York, Member of the Board of Trustees (since 2016)

Personal life
Marclay began dating curator Lydia Yee in 1991, and the couple married in 2011.

Recognition
At the 2011 Venice Biennale, representing the United States of America, Marclay was recognized as the best artist in the official exhibition, winning the Golden Lion for The Clock.  Newsweek responded by naming Marclay one of the ten most important artists of today. Accepting the Golden Lion, Marclay invoked Andy Warhol, thanking the jury "for giving The Clock its fifteen minutes". In 2013, Dale Eisinger of Complex ranked Berlin Mix the 17th best work of performance art in history.

In 2015 the White Cube presented a major solo exhibition including a range of new work and a lively programme of weekly performances played by the London Sinfonietta and guests including Thurston Moore and Mica Levi.

Selected exhibitions
Christian Marclay – 1987 – The Clocktower, P.S. 1 Museum, New York City, USA
Directions: Christian Marclay – 1990 – Hirshhorn Museum and Sculpture Garden, Smithsonian Institution, Washington, D.C., USA
Christian Marclay – 1991 – Interim Art, London, England
The Wind Section – 1992 – Galerie Jennifer Flay, Paris, France
Christian Marclay – 1993 – Margo Leavin Gallery, Los Angeles
Christian Marclay – 1994 – Daadgalerie, Berlin, Germany; and Fri-Art Centre d'art contemporain Kunsthalle, Fribourg, Switzerland
Amplification – 1995 – Chiesa San Staë, Venice Biennale, Venice, Italy
Accompagnement Musical – 1995 – Musée d'Art et d'Histoire, Geneva, Switzerland
Arranged and Conducted – 1997 – Kunsthaus, Zurich, Switzerland
Pictures at an Exhibition – 1997 – Whitney Museum of American Art at Philip Morris, New York City, USA
Christian Marclay – 1999 – Paula Cooper Gallery, New York City, USA
Replay – 2007 – Cité de la Musique, Paris, France
Replay – 2007–08 – Australian Centre for the Moving Image, Melbourne, Australia
Snap! – 2008 – Galerie Art and Essai, Rennes, France
Honk If You Love Silence – 2008 – Mamco, Geneva, Switzerland
You Said He Said She Said – 2008 – Seiler+Mosseri-Marlio Galerie, Zurich, Switzerland
Replay – 2009 – DHC/Art, Montréal, Canada
Broken English – 2009 – Seiler+Mosseri-Marlio Galerie, Zurich, Switzerland (with Justin Bennett, Shana Lutker, Euan Macdonald, Navid Nuur and Mungo Thomson)
Vinyl – 2009 – Lydgalleriet, Bergen, Norway (with Flo Kaufmann, Janek Schaefer and Otomo Yoshihide)
The Record: Contemporary Art and Vinyl – 2010 – Nasher Museum of Art at Duke University, Durham, North Carolina, USA
The Clock – 15 October to 13 November 2010 – White Cube, London, England
The Clock – 21 January to 19 February 2011 – Paula Cooper Gallery, New York City, USA
The Clock – 16 February to 17 April 2011 – Hayward Gallery, London, England
The Clock – 26 May to 31 July 2011 – Los Angeles County Museum of Art, Los Angeles
The Clock – 4 June to 27 November 2011 – Corderie dell'Arsenale, Venice Biennale, Italy
The Clock – 23 August to 20 October 2011 – Israel Museum, Jerusalem
The Clock – 3 to 5 September 2011 – MNAM (Musée National d'Art Moderne - Centre Pompidou), Paris, France
The Clock – 19 September to 31 December 2011 – Museum of Fine Arts, Boston, MA, USA
 Ephemera – Christian Marclay, 8 to 15 October, galerie mfc-michèle didier, Paris. 
The Clock – 10 February to 21 May 2012 (extended) – National Gallery of Canada, Ottawa, Canada
The Clock – March to June 2012 – Museum of Contemporary Art, Sydney, Australia
The Clock – 14 September to 25 November 2012 – The Power Plant Gallery, Toronto, Canada
The Clock – 7 January to 7 April 2013 – Wexner Center for the Arts Columbus, Ohio, USA
The Clock – 11 October 2013 to 5 January 2014 – Winnipeg Art Gallery Winnipeg, Manitoba, Canada
The Clock - 6 March 2014 - 18 May 2014 - Guggenheim Bilbao Bilbao, Biscay, Spain
The Clock - 17 May 2014 to 2 July 2014 - MNAM (Musée National d'Art Moderne - Centre Pompidou), Paris, France
The Clock - 4 July to 15 September 2014 - Centre Pompidou Metz, Metz, France
The Clock - 14 September 2018 - 20 January 2019 - Tate Modern, London, England 
Sound Stories - 25 August 2019 - 11 November 2019 - Los Angeles County Museum of Art, Los Angeles 
Christian Marclay  – 16 November 2022 to 27 February 2023 - Centre Pompidou, Paris, France

Artist books
 Ephemera, Bruxelles, mfc-michèle didier, 2009. Limited edition of 90 numbered and signed copies and 10 artist’s proofs. Voir mfc-michèle didier

References

External links
Seiler+Mosseri-Marlio Galerie: Upcoming Exhibits.
White Cube: Christian Marclay.
European Graduate School: Christian Marclay.
Christian Marclay Discography.
Christian Marclay, de la musique aux sons (in French).
Audio of "Tabula Rasa" (2005) for three turntables and cutting lathe by Christian Marclay and Flo Kaufmann. Site broken 25 June 2011.
Audio of "Phonodrum" by Christian Marclay from Records 1981–1989 (1997).
The Record: Contemporary Art and Vinyl.
Review of Album Without a Cover (1986), Spin, January 1986.
Winnipeg Art Gallery: Christian Marclay's The Clock

Interviews 
Journal of Contemporary Art (Spring 1992).
Perfect Sound Forever (March 1998).
Interview with Akira Sanematsu (28 March 2002).
KultureFlash (July 2003). Site broken 25 June 2011.
Some Assembly Required (12 June 2006).
Daily Telegraph (1 March 2008).

1955 births
Free improvisation
Swiss contemporary artists
Experimental composers
Academic staff of European Graduate School
Massachusetts College of Art and Design alumni
Noise musicians
Living people
People from San Rafael, California
Male classical composers
20th-century male musicians
Atavistic Records artists
Cuneiform Records artists
Knitting Factory Records artists
Intakt Records artists